Thirteen vessels of the Royal Navy have borne the name HMS Mohawk, after the Mohawk, an indigenous tribe of North America:

  was a 6-gun sloop launched at Oswego on the Great Lakes in 1756; the French seized her and seven other vessels of the Canadian Great Lakes Squadron when Fort Oswego surrendered to General Montcalm that same year.
  was a 16-gun snow, constructed in 1759, that participated in the Battle of the Thousand Islands, during the French and Indian War. She was lost in 1764. 
 HMS Mohawk was a Massachusetts privateer launched in 1781 that  captured in 1782 and that the Royal Navy briefly took into service, before selling her in 1783. She then became a slaver and merchant vessel, before becoming a British privateer in 1797. The French captured her in the Mediterranean in 1801 and she served the French Navy until she was sold at Toulon in 1814.
  was a schooner listed in 1795 and operating on the Great Lakes out of Kingston, Ontario. She was condemned in 1803.
 HMS Mowhawk was a sloop listed in 1798. Nothing more is known of her.
 HMS Mohawk was the American navy's 12-gun brig Viper captured in 1813 and sold in 1814.
 HMS Mohawk was to have been an 18-gun  but she was renamed  before being launched in 1813.  She was sold in 1832.
  was a paddle-vessel launched in 1843 and sold in 1852.
  was a  wooden screw gunvessel launched in 1856. She was sold in 1862 to the Emperor of China and renamed Pekin.
  was an  launched in 1886 and sold in 1905.
  was a  destroyer launched in 1907 and sold in 1919.
  was a  destroyer launched in 1937. She was sunk in April 1941 during the action off Sfax.
  was a  launched in 1962 and sold for scrap in 1981.

Citations and references
Citations

References
 
  

Royal Navy ship names